Robert Junor (10 January 1888 – 26 July 1957) was an Australian cricketer. He played one first-class cricket match for Victoria in 1915.

See also
 List of Victoria first-class cricketers

References

External links
 

1888 births
1957 deaths
Australian cricketers
Victoria cricketers
Cricketers from Melbourne